Warren Koegel (born November 1, 1949) is a former American football player and college athletics administrator. Koegel attended Pennsylvania State University, where he played for coach Joe Paterno on the Penn State Nittany Lions football team. He went on to play parts of three seasons in the NFL between 1971 and 1974, playing for the Oakland Raiders, St. Louis Cardinals, and New York Jets. Koegel later served as athletic director at Coastal Carolina University from 2000 to 2010, and at Jacksonville State University from 2011 to 2014.

References

Living people
1949 births
Coastal Carolina Chanticleers athletic directors
Jacksonville State Gamecocks athletic directors
New York Jets players
Oakland Raiders players
Penn State Nittany Lions football players
Rutgers Scarlet Knights football coaches
St. Louis Cardinals (football) players
UConn Huskies football coaches
Wyoming Cowboys football coaches
People from Mineola, New York
Players of American football from New York (state)